Nadieh Bremer is a data scientist and data visualization designer. She is based out of a small town outside of Amsterdam.

Education 
Bremer graduated cum laude from Leiden University with Masters of Science in Astronomy. She also attended University of California, Berkeley.

Career 
Early in her career, Bremer worked as a Senior Consultant of Advanced Analytics and Data Visualizations at Deloitte. She is currently a freelance data designer under the name "Visual Cinnamon," working with small startups to provide custom visualizations of their data.

Publications 
Her work has been published in The Washington Post, Bloomberg CityLab, Scientific American, The Week, and DigitalArts, among others.

She co-authored Data Sketches with Shirley Wu in February 2021.

Awards 
 "Politics & Global", Gold - Information is Beautiful Awards (2018)
 Best Data Visualization - North American Digital Media Awards (2018)
 Best Investigative Data Journalism - Online Journalism Awards (2018)
 Best Individual - Information is Beautiful Awards (2017)
 "Unusual", Gold - Information is Beautiful Awards (2017)
 "Science & Tech", Silver - Information is Beautiful Awards (2017)
 Rising Star - Information is Beautiful Awards (2016)

References

External links
 Nadieh Bremer

Year of birth missing (living people)
Living people
Leiden University alumni
University of California, Berkeley alumni
Data scientists
Information graphic designers
Dutch artists
21st-century Dutch astronomers
Dutch women scientists
Women data scientists
Deloitte people